The Enchanted Pig (Romanian: Porcul cel fermecat) is a Romanian fairy tale, collected in Rumanische Märchen and also by Petre Ispirescu in Legende sau basmele românilor. Andrew Lang included it in The Red Fairy Book.

The tale is related to the international cycle of the Animal as Bridegroom or "The Search for the Lost Husband". wherein a human maiden marries a husband in animal form, breaks a prohibition and has to search for him.

Synopsis
A king goes to war and tells his daughters they may go anywhere in the castle except one room. One day, they disobey and find a book open in it. It says that the oldest shall marry a prince from the east, the second a prince from the west, and the youngest a pig from the north. The youngest is horror-struck, but her sisters manage to convince her that it is impossible.

The king returns and discovers, from the youngest's unhappiness, what they had done. He resolves to face it as best they can. A prince from the east marries the oldest, and a prince from the west the second, and the youngest becomes distressed. A pig comes to woo her, and when the king would have refused his consent, the city fills with pigs. The king tells his daughter that he is certain there is something strange about this pig, and that he believes magic has been at work. If she were to marry the pig, it might be broken.

She marries the pig and goes off with him. At his home, he becomes a man every night, and is so kind that he wins her heart. She asks a witch what happened to her husband. The witch tells her to tie a thread to his foot to free him.  When the young wife does so, her husband wakes and tells her that the spell would have fallen from him in three days, but now he must remain in this shape, and she will not find him without wearing out three pairs of iron shoes and blunting a steel staff.

She sets out as soon as she gets herself three pairs of iron shoes and a steel staff. She wanders far, until she comes to the house of the Moon. The Moon's mother lets her in, and while she is there, she gives birth to a son.  The Moon's mother tells her that the Moon could not tell her where to find her husband, but she can go on, to the Sun. She also gives her a chicken and tells her to keep every one of the bones. The princess thanks her, throws away one pair of shoes, which was worn out, and puts on another.

She finally wends her way to the Sun's house, and the Sun's mother lets her in. She hides her, because the Sun is always ill-tempered when he returns. He is, but his mother soothes him, and asked about her husband. He cannot tell her, so his mother sends her on, to the Wind. Also, she gives her a chicken and tells her to keep care of the bones. Here, she throws out the second pair of shoes.

At the Wind's house, his mother discovers that her husband lives in a wood no axe could cut through. She sends her to it, with a chicken and instructions to keep every bone. The princess goes on, although her third pair of shoes wears through, on the Milky Way. She finds the castle where her husband lives, and the bones stick together to form her a ladder to let her in. She is one bone short, and cuts off her little finger to complete the ladder. Her husband returns, and the spell on him is broken.

He reveals that he is a prince, who had killed a dragon, and the dragon's mother, a witch, had turned him to that shape and then advised her to tie the string to keep him in it. They set out to his father's kingdom, and then return to her father's kingdom.

Translations
The tale was also translated and published in the compilation The Foundling Prince & Other Tales (1917). The tale was also translated as The Enchanted Hog by Robert Nisbet Bain and published as a part of a supplement in his translation of Ignáz Kunós's book of Turkish fairy tales. The tale was also translated as The Enchanted Prince by Jacob Bernard Segall.

Romanian historian Nicolae Iorga translated the tale into French as Le prince à tête de cochon ("The Prince with the Pig Head"), although in his version, the heroine passes by the houses of Sainte Lundi (Holy Monday), Sainte Vendredi (Holy Friday), Saint Soleil (Holy Sun) and Saint Vent (Holy Wind) on her way to her husband.

Analysis

Tale type

The first part of the tale corresponds to Aarne-Thompson-Uther Index as ATU 441, "In an Enchanted Skin". Others of this type include The Pig King. This tale type is characterized by a childless couple (royal or peasant) wishing for a child, "even if it was a hedgehog" (or pig, or boar).

The second part of the tale follows Aarne-Thompson tale type 425A, "The Search for the Lost Husband": the maiden breaks a taboo or burns the husband's animal skin and, to atone, she must wear down a numbered pair of metal shoes. On her way to her husband, she asks for the help of the Sun, the Moon and the Wind. According to Hans-Jörg Uther, the main feature of tale type ATU 425A is "bribing the false bride for three nights with the husband". Others of this type include The Black Bull of Norroway, The Brown Bear of Norway, The Daughter of the Skies, East of the Sun and West of the Moon, The Tale of the Hoodie, Master Semolina, The Sprig of Rosemary, The Enchanted Snake, and White-Bear-King-Valemon. In Balkanic variants of the tale type, the husband curses his wife not to give birth to their child until she has sought him out.

Motifs

The heroine's helpers 
In a study published posthumously, Romanian folklorist  noted that, in Romanian and in some South Slavic variants, instead of meeting the Sun, the Moon and the Wind on the way to her husband, the heroine finds incarnations of the days of the week, like Holy Wednesday and Holy Friday. They function the same as the elements and gift the heroine with golden objects. French philologist Jean Boutière, in his doctoral thesis, analysed the variants available at the time and concluded that the heroine seeks the help of Holy Wednesday, Holy Friday and Holy Sunday (which are sometimes replaced by Holy Monday and Holy Saturday), and, rarely, of the Moon, the Sun and the Wind.

Additionally, researcher Vitalii Sîrf noted that, in some Gagauz tales, the heroine goes in search of her lost husband, and meets Baba-Vineri ("Old Woman Friday"), Baba Miercuri (Gagauz: Çarșamba babusu, "Old Woman Wednesday"), Duminica-mamă (Gagauz: Pazar babusu, "Grandmother Sunday"). These characters gift the heroine with golden objects she will use to bribe the false bride.

The pig husband 
Polish philologist Mark Lidzbarski noted that the pig prince usually appears in Romance language tales, while the hedgehog as the animal husband occurs in Germanic and Slavic tales. Also, according to Swedish folklorist , in type ATU 441 the animal husband may be a hedgehog, a wild boar or a porcupine.

Scholarship recognized the popularity of the character of the pig-husband (Romanian: "soţul-porc") in Romania.

Variants

Europe

Romania 
In a tale collected by folklorist  from the Transylvanian Saxons, with the title Das Borstenkind (A serteruhás gyermek or "The Child in the Pighair Clothes"), a three-year-old prince is eating some of the apples his mother, the queen, has been peeling. Angered, she curses her son to become a wild boar. He transforms into one and escapes with other swines to the pigpen. Some time later, he reaches the cottage of a poor swineherd and his wife, who wished for child, even if it was a pig. As answer to their prayers, the porcine prince appears. They live like a family for 17 years. One day, another king decrees that her daughter should marry after her suitor accomplishes three tasks: to build a silver castle, to build a golden castle seven miles away from the silver one, and to erect a bridge between both castles made of diamond and crystal. The wild boar boy does so and marries the king's daughter, much to her disgust. One night, the princess awakes and sees a beautiful golden-haired prince, the boarskin at his side. He tells her he is a cursed king's son and wants her to keep quiet about it, lest he does not break the enchantment. Sometime later, the reveals the prince's condition to her mother, the second queen, who suggests her daughter takes the boarskin and burns it in the stove. Seeing he was betrayed by his wife - having been so close to breaking the curse - , he says to the princess he will vanish from her eyes and that he will be at the end of the world, from where no soul can save him. The distraught princess, then, decides to travel to the end of the world to save her husband: with the help of the Wind's winged steed, reaches the Moon. The Moon does know not where her husband is, but gives the princess a silver nut and allows her to ride of the lunar horse to the Sun's house. The princess next reaches the Sun's house, who also does not know where her husband it, but gives her a golden nut and advises her to consult with its children, the stars. The princess takes the Sun's horse and pays a visit to the Evening Star and the Morning Star, who point her to the end of the world, where her husband is to be married to the princess of that place. The Morning Star gives her a star-studded nut and takes her to the castle at the end of the world. The princess cracks open each nut to produce three dresses (a silver one, a golden one, and a third reflecting the stars in the sky) which she uses to trade for three nights with her husband.

Romanian folklorist  collected a variant very similar to Borstenkind. In his version, titled Ion porc-împărat, the prince becomes a pig and is adopted by a poor human couple. The pig convinces his father to ask for the hand of the king's daughter in marriage. To dissuade the poor couple, the king sets three difficult tasks to be performed, which the pig suitor does with ease. After he marries the princess, he takes off his skin at night to become human. The princess, pregnant at this point, burns the skin. Her husband wakes up and curses her that she will not give birth to their son until he embraces her once again, and that she will only find him at the end of the world, in the city of Ciumii. Saying this, he vanishes, and the princess departs after him: after she commissions seven pairs of iron shoes and seven iron canes, she begins her quest. She reaches the house of the Mother of the Winds (Mama Vintului), who gives her some little mice, and directs her to sfinta Luna (the Moon). The Moon gives her a silver nut and guided her to sfintul Soare (the Sun). The Sun gives her a golden nut and tells her to go the Morning Star (Luceafărul). The Morning Star gives her a coloured nut and tells the princess to take a ship to the end of the world, where her husband is. The princess sails to the end of the world, to the city of Ciumii, and finds her husband as the consort of the local empress. The princess cries over her situation, and each time the magic nuts crack open to produce, respectively, silver dresses, golden dresses and dresses decorated with stars and gems. The princess uses the dresses to bribe the empress for three nights with her husband. On the third night, the emperor (her husband) awakens and places his hand on the princess, and she gives birth to a golden-haired boy.

In another Romanian variant, Povestea cu Poarca, collected by writer and folklorist Cristea Sandu Timoc from Preda Petre, the first part of the tale opens with the discovery of a talking pig in a litter of pigs by the farmer. The pig is adopted by the human couple and, when he comes of age, marries a human princess. After their marriage, the pig husband takes off his porcine skin and becomes a human prince. The second part of the tale continues as the princess burns his pig skin and is forced to look for him (ATU 425). The princess meets Sinta Vineri (Holy Friday), who directs her to her husband. On the way, the princess gives birth to her child and meets her husband in a hut in the forest.

In this tale, a poor old couple wants to have a son that may care for them, so they exit their house and split up in the forest to find any creature they can adopt as a son. They find a pig rolling in the mud and take it as their son to raise. Years pass, the pig becomes a boar and says he wants to marry the king's daughter, so his father goes to the king and asks her hand in marriage. The king sets a task first: for the suitor to build a bridge of gold and gems, with apple trees along the path. The pig suitor fulfills the task and the princess has to marry him. After they retire to the bridal chambers, the pig takes off its skin and tells her he is an enchanted prince, and that she has to keep his secret for two days after their marriage for the enchantment to be over. The next day, the princess's mother visits her daughter and notices her mood change: horrified just before the wedding, and now quite contented. The princess reveals her pig husband is a beautiful man when he takes off the pigskin, so the queen advises her daughter to burn it the next time he takes it off. That same night, the princess takes the pigskin and throws it in the fire. Her husband wakes up and admonishes her: he is cursed again and has to depart for the city of Shalagastran; before he departs, he places an iron ring around her belly, and curses her not to give birth until she finds him again. He vanishes. The princes goes after him for seven years, and finds a woman named Friday on the road. Friday summons every bird with the crack of a whip, but none of the birds know of Shalagastran. Friday directs her to her sister Sunday, who summons all the birds. A little bird comes late and says it has come from Shalagastran. Sunday orders the bird to take the princess to Shalagastran. Just outside the city, the princess sees three youths quarreling over three magic objects: a cane that petrifies people, a cap of invisibility and a pair of shoes that can cross water. The princess tricks the youths: she uses the cane on them, takes the cap and the shoes  and goes to Shalagastran to her husband's house. She wears the cap and waits inside his house for him to finish his food. Still invisible, he accidentally touches her and the iron girdles around her drop to the ground. The man sees his wife and their son next to him, but says theirs is not a joyful reunion. After their encounter, they become stars and fly to the sky, but cannot ever be together again.

Folklorist and ethnologue  provided the summary of a tale from "Nieder-Eidisch" (Ideciu de Jos) with the title Kraushaarferkel ("The Piglet with Curly Hair"). In this tale, a queen is unpeeling an apple for herself, when her son comes in and eats the apple. The queen calls her son a swine; he turns into a piglet and runs into the forest. Meanwhile, a poor couple in the forest wishes for a son, even if he is a pig. Suddenly, the piglet appears to them, and the couple adopt him as their son. Years pass; and the piglet asks his adoptive father to go to the king and ask for the princess's hand in marriage. The king hears the old man's proposition, and orders him to fulfill tree tasks: to build a copper bridge, with trees blooming with flowers and with ripe and unripen fruits, then to build a silver bridge, and finally a golden bridge. The piglet fulfills the three tasks and gets to marry the princess. On the wedding night, the piglet takes off the porcine skin and becomes a youth "more beautiful than anyone else under the sun". On Sunday, the queen visits her daughter, who tells her that her husband is a man underneath it. The queen then advises her to give a sleeping potion to the pig, take the pigskin and burn it in the oven. The princess follows her instructions. The next morning, the human piglet looks for his covering, but does not find it. He then tells the princess his curse would have been lifted in one year, but now she will have to find him in the dark world, and vanishes. The princess goes to her parents to cry, but decides to go looking for him in iron shoes, seven dresses and with an iron cane. She passes by the Evening Star, who gives her a copper nut; the Moon, who gives her a silver nut, and thirdly the Sun, who gives her a golden nut. Finally, she reaches the dark world, where she learns her husband is to be married to the queen of the dark world. The princess then cracks open the nuts to produce three dresses (one copper, another silver, and the third golden), and waits by the church's door for the queen of the dark world. She bribes the queen with the dresses for one night with the human prince. She fails on the first two nights, but manages to wake him up on the third night. Her now human husband hears her woes of "wanting to be released from this burden"; he touches her and she gives birth to a golden-haired son.

Literary variants 
Romanian author and raconteur Ion Creangă developed a literary treatment of the story with his tale  ("The Story of the Pig"), or Le Conte du Porc, also classified as ATU 425A, "Search for the Lost Husband". In his story, a very elderly couple adopts a pig as their son. When the king announces that he will marry his daughter to whoever performs some tasks (to pave a golden bridge in front of the palace, and to build a palace that rivals the king's), the pig suitor does and marries the princess. After the marriage, he takes off his pig skin at night. His wife burns the pig skin in the oven and he curses her not to give birth to their child until she finds him, Făt-Frumos, in a place called Mănăstirea-de-Tămâie (The Monastery of Incenses), and he places his hands on her again. The princess begins her quest and pays a visit to incarnations of Holy Wednesday, Holy Friday and Holy Sunday. Holy Wednesday gives her provisions for the road (a loaf of blessed bread and a glass of wine), and a golden distaff; Holy Friday gives the princess a golden reel; ad Holy Sunday gives her a golden plate and a golden hen with chicks. With their help, she reaches her remote destination, the Monastery, and uses the gifts to bribe the sorceress for a three nights with her husband (one gift for one night). He husband wakes up on the third night and places his hand on her body, finally allowing their child to be born, and punishes the sorceress.

Romani people 
In a Romani tale from Püspökladány, Az elátkozott királyfi, aki sündisznó volt ("The Enchanted Prince Who was a Hedgehog"), a queen, who did not know how she became pregnant, gives birth to a hedgehog named Rudolf. The hedgehog boy works as his father's shepherd, "better than ten shepherds". One day, he pleads his father to ask for the hand of the daughter of a foreign king. He marries the eldest daughter and, inside the carriage, jumps into his wife's lap, prickling her skin. She is hurt and feels insulted. This incident also occurs with the middle daughter. He marries the third one, Ludinca, who does not seem to be bothered by his action. Later on, she tells his mother, the queen, she is pregnant, and his mother suspects infidelity. However, the princess reveals her husband is a handsome prince. His mother suggests she burns the skin in the stove, which she does. The prince smells the skin burning and laments that they could not wait three more nights. He also curses his wife not to give birth until he has embraced her three times, and vanishes. Ludinca, still pregnant, goes searching for him. She reaches the hut of an old lady, who summons her sons, the Star, the Moon and the Sun, to help the maiden. The Sun tells her of a castle just across the Danube where the Tündér (fairy) princess lives. The old lady gives her a golden duck for her to use to bribe the fairy princess for three nights with her husband.

Gagauz people 
In a tale from the Gagauz people with the title "Заколдованный молодец" ("Enchanted Youth"), an old couple have no son, so decide to find any animal to be their child. The old man finds a piglet in the mud and brings it home. Some time later, the piglet begins to talk, and tells his father he will marry the boyar's daughter. His father takes the piglet to the boyar's court to ask for his daughter's hand, and the boyar sets a task for him: to build road between the piglet's house and the palace, sided by gardens with trees of golden apples and singins birds of paradise. The piglet fulfills the task, but the boyar sets another one: to have his castle stand on water. The piglet also fulills the task, and gets to marry his daughter. During the wedding, the piglet takes off its skin and becomes a handsome youth. After they go to bed, the boyar's daughter takes the skin and throws it in the oven. The next morning, the youth cannot find the pigskin, and ties an iron ring around his wife's belly, cursing her not to give birth until he places his hand on her again, and vanishes. The boyar's daughter begins her quest, and meets Jumaa-babu ("Grandmother Friday") and Pazar-babu ("Grandmother Sunday"). Pazar-babu summons the birds of the world, and one tells the youth is under Jada-babu's power. Pazar-babu gives her a golden spinning wheel, a golden arshin and a golden reel, and tells her to go to the fountain, draw out the golden objects to attract Jada-babu's attention, and bribes her for a night with her husband. The boyar's daughter does as instructed and sells the golden objects. She manages to wake her husband on the third night, he places his hand on her body and their child is born.

Hungary 
Hungarian ethnographer  collected a Hungarian tale from Szováta, in Székely. In this tale, titled Disznóficzkó ("The Pigboy"), an old woman earns her living by spinning. She spins threads of gold, silver and diamond, and gives to the queen. Later, the old woman's pig son tells her to go to the royal couple and ask for the princess's hand in marriage. The king hears the marriage proposal, but first orders tasks for his daughter's suitor: to break a rock, build a vineyard, and have freshly squeezed wine and a bowl of grapes on the king's table by morning. The pigboy summons all devils and people from hell and fulfills the task. The next task is to build a diamond road between the king's palace and the pigboy's house, with many fruitful trees along the path, in many states of ripening, and a diamond well in the middle of the road. The pig suitor fulfills the task and marries the princess in church. The princess goes to the old woman's poor house and is given a bed of straw to lie on. That night, the pig suitor becomes a prince and tells his wife not to reveal the secret for three more days. They spend the night together and she is pregnant. On the third night, the princess tells her mother-in-law that the pig becomes a prince. While the couple are asleep, the old woman takes the pigskin and tosses it in the oven. The man awakens and waits by the door for his wife to awaken. After she does, he goes to embrace her, and places two iron rings around her belly, which he explains will only come off when he touches her again. Then he becomes a dove and flies away. The princess asks her father to commission iron shoes and iron canes, and begins her quest. She passes by the Holy Monday (Szent-Hétfő), Holy Tuesday (Szent-Keddhez), Holy Wednesday (Szent-Szereda), Holy Thursday (Szent-Csütörtök), Holy Friday (Szent-Pentek), Holy Saturday (Szent-Szombat) and Holy Sunday (Szent-Vasárnap) - which are referred to as male entities in this tale -, but only Holy Sunday, by summoning all devils of the world, has any idea about her husband's location. The little devil takes the princess to a valley, and tells her husband is sleeping in a diamond palace down in the valley. The princess enters the palace and goes to his room: he sleeps chained with a golden chain to the golden bed. The princess cries out to him and he awakens. He embraces her, the iron rings come off of her her and she gives birth to a golden-haired boy. Then they turn into three doves, fly up to the sky and become a star.

Lithuania 
In a Lithuanian variant, The Hedgehog and his Bride, a hedgehog is adopted by a poor old couple. The animal, named Prickly, insists he will marry the king's daughter, but first he must perform some tasks for him. He is successful and marries the princess. At night, the woman sees her husband is a handsome man, after he takes off his animal skin. One day, a servant unknowingly burns the hedgehog's enchanted skin and the prince tells his wife she must go on a quest for him, since he was so close to breaking the curse, had the servant not burnt the animal skin. He disappears, and the princess talks to her father-in-law how she can find him. The father-in-law wanders many years until he reaches the sea shore, and summons his son, by saying the princess is looking for him. The hedgehog son comes out of the sea in the shape of white foam and tells his father to have the princess herself come to him. The princess then goes to her husband's location, and learns from him the way to save him. Near the end of the tale, both she and her husband agree to be turned into frogs by some witches in order to prove their loyalty towards each other. At last, they are transformed back into humans.

Germany 
In a German variant from Silesia titled Der Brunnen ("The Fountain"), collected by literary historian Heinrich Pröhle and later republished by German folklorist , a father sends his three daughters to fetch water from the well to cure him. The first two go tt the well and hear a voice telling them to stay by the voice's owner, and in exchange he will give them the water. Out of fear, they rush back home. The third daughter, whom her father loves the most, goes to the well and agrees to the voice's proposal. Later, a hedgehog (German: Igel) comes to the girls' house and goes to sleep in the third sister's bed. The hedgehog takes off the animal skin, becomes a human prince and sleeps by the third sister's bedside. The elder girls take the animal skin and burn it. The next morning, the prince wakes up and, seeing that the skin is burnt, tells the third sister that she will only find him by wearing down an iron cane and a pair of iron shoes, then going to the Glass Mountain. He vanishes, and the girl goes after him. On her quest, she meets a Star, the Sun and the Moon, and gains three nuts from them. Finally, she reaches the Glass Mountain and climbs it, arriving at a castle. The girl takes up a job as a maidservant, in order to be closer to the prince, who is set to be married to the mistress of the castle. Each night, the girl cracks open a nut; a splendid dress comes out of it: the first, a dress shining like starlight; the second gleaming like moonlight, and the third bright as sunlight. The girl uses the three dresses to bribe the prince's bride for three nights in his room. The first two nights, she fails to wake him up, but on the third he wakes up. The girl and the prince marry, and he expels the second bride.

Slovenia 
In a Slovenian tale translated into Russian with the title "Граф-боров" ("Count Borov"), a countess longs to have a child, and, after seeing a sow with its piglets, wishes to have a son, even if he is a piglet. Thus, one year later, she gives birth to a piglet, to her husband's consternation. Twenty-four years pass, and the countess's son, now a pig, demands his mother finds him a wife. She talks to a commoner for one of his three daughters as bride, and he sends him his first daughter. The pig and the first girl marry; he dirties himself in the mud and goes to clean himself in the bride's dress. She insults him; he takes offense and banishes her. The same happens to the second bride. The commoner agrees to send his third daughter as the pig's wife; she asks courteously during the wedding feast, and does not mind the mud in her clothes. That same night, the pig takes off the swine skin and reveals he is a handsome man. The pig's human wife divulges to the countess her son is beautiful under the pigskin, and they plot together to burn it that night. They do, and, in the next morning, the countess's son cannot find his pigskin, and proclaims that his human wife shall seek him out beyond seven mountains, seven valleys and after crying rivers of tears. He then vanishes. Time passes, and the pig's wife decides to look for him: she meets the First Wind, the Second Wind and the Third Wind, who each gives her a nut, and the Third Wind gives her a pair of magic boots, so she can take large steps to reach her husband's castle, where he is set to be married to another woman. The pig's true wife cracks open the three nuts and finds a golden ring, golden earrings, and a dress embroidered with gems and pearls, which she uses to bribe the false bride for three nights with her husband. She fails on the first two nights, but wakes him up on the third one. During the wedding, the pig count, now human, asks the guests the riddle of the old and the new key, and which he should keep.

Poland 
In a tale collected from teller Józefa Pidek, from Bychawka, in Lublin, with the title O królewiczu zaklętym w wieprzka ("The Tale of a Prince Who was Turned into a Hog"), an old couple have no son. One day, the old man goes to the market and buys a hog to bring to his wife. The old couple feed the hog and raise it as their son. Years later, the hog asks his adoptive father to ask for the hand of the local king's daughter in marriage. The old man goes to the king to report the hog's proposal and the king, in response, orders the hog to build a golden road between the old couple's hut and the palace, otherwise the old man loses his head. The hog fulfills the king's task, but the monarch orders him to bring a herd of 100 mares and their 100 foals, each of them with golden bridle and fetters. The hog also fulfills the second task, and marries the princess, to the queen's immense sadness. On the wedding night, the princess waits for her hog husband, but, when she lies on their bed, she sees a handsome youth, who explains he is enchanted unernerath the porcine skin and they have to wait a whole year for the curse to be broken. The next morning, the princess wakes up contented and her mother asks her the reason for such happiness. After much insistence, the princess tells the queen about the human under the hog skin, and she advises her daughter to place some hot coals next to his bedside, so her husband kicks the hogskin out of the bed and into the coals. The princess follows her mother's words and lets the hogskin burn. Her husband wakes up and, noticing the lost skin, hits her nose, drops of her blood falling on his shirt. He then gives her a ball of yarn, telling her to use it if she wants to find him, and vanishes. After a while, the princess decides to look for her husband and casts the ball of yarn before her to find a path. With the yarn, she passes by three houses belonging to her in-laws, a prince, a sorcerer and a woman. The first two expel her and deny her shelter, but she is welcomed by the woman. Her sister-in-law tells her the human hog is preparing for his wedding to another bride, but they are washing a bloodied shirt. The princess is to wash the shirt and seize the opportunity to hide behind a door and crack a ring in two to jog her husband's memory. The princess follows her sister-in-law's advice and goes to the nearby castle where she washes her husband's bloodied shirt. During the wedding, the princess hides behind a door and breaks a ring in two: a pigeon flies to her shoulder and another perches on the human hog. The event makes the human hog recall his memory and he recognizes his true wife, the princess.

Corsica 
Linguist Genevieve Massignon collected a Corsican tale from an informant from Cambia, Castagniccia. In this tale, titled Le petit cochon rouge or U porcellu rossu ("The Little Red Pig"), a couple has a little red pig as their son. One day, when he is old enough, he asks to be married, but his parents question the possibility of anyone marrying a pig. Eventually, a girl comes to marry the pig, and they live together. Some nights later, the pig's mother asks her daughter-in-law how she can live with the animal, and she answers he becomes a youth at night. The following night, the girl leaves the door ajar so the pig's mother can see her son's human shape on bed, then she enters, takes his pigskin and throws it in the fire. It crackles thrice, then burns. The next morning, the human pig asks his wife for his skin, and she answers his mother burned it. The youth then says his wife will never find him again unless she wears down one pair of iron shoes, and vanishes. The girl puts on the iron shoes and begins her journey. She meets three old woman on the road, and each gives her a nut, an almond, and a hazelnut. The girl finally reaches another city, where she finds her husband already married to another woman. She cracks open the nuts and discovers beautiful threads inside (the first of silk, the second of silver and the third of gold), which she uses to bribe for three nights with her husband's new bride. The girl fails on the first two nights, since the second wife has given the pig youth a sleeping potion, but she manages to wake him up on the third night. The human pig explains everything to the second wife, then returns with the girl to his parents.

Asia 
In a Russian-language tale from Transbaikal with the title "Сынок-Поросёночек" ("The Little Pig Son"), a poor old couple worries that, now in their old age, they have no one to call their son, so they decide to adopt the first creature they find. The old man goes to the woods and sees a sow and its eleven piglets walk in the mud, while one stays behind. The old man takes the stray piglet home and raises it as his son, while his wife feeds and takes care of it. Years later, the old man goes returns home from the market with good news: the king has decided to marry his daughter, the princess, to any youth that can build a crystal bridge, with gardens alongside the path and with singing birds. Just as he says that, the little piglet telss them he can fulfill the king's orders and marry the princess. The old man goes to the king to tell him his son, the pig, wants to try his luck in building the bridge. The little pig appears in court and tells the king to look over the window: the crystal bridge is there! The king, unwanting to go back on his word, delivers his daughter to the pig and they move out to a palace. On the wedding night, the piglet enters the bedroom, takes off the porcine skin and becomes a handsome youth. The next day, he puts on the pigskin. This goes on for several days, until the princess visits her parents and tells them about her husband's pigskin: the king warns her against doing anything, while the queen suggests she takes the skin and burns it in an oven. The princess follows her mother's advice and burns the pigskin. The pig youth wakes up and, upon seeing his wife's deed, despairs that a whirlwind will take him away and she can only find him in the crystal monastery. The man disappears, and so their castle and the crystal bridge. She begins to walk through the forest until she reaches the hut of Saint Sereda, who welcomes her. Saint Sereda gives the princess a golden reel and summons the animals and the birds to ask the location of the crystal monastery. The princess continues on her journey and meets Saint Pyatnitsa on her hut. After spending the night there, Saint Pyatnitsa summons the animals and the birds to divine the location of her husband, but they also do not know. She then gives the princess a golden spindle and sends her on her way. Lastly, the princess reaches the hut of Saint Troitsa, who also summons the animals; a small lark knows the location of the crystal monastery. Saint Troitsa gives the princess a tray with a golden hen and its chicks, and orders the lark to take the girl there. Once she reaches the crystal monastery, the princess is asked by a servant what is the motive of her presence. She says she is looking for her husband; and the servant reports to the mistress of the castle, who is the pig husband's mother in human form. The princess trades the golden objects with her mother-in-law for a night with her son, but the woman gives him milk laced with a sleeping potion. The princess fails on the first two nights, but succeeds on the third.

Americas
In a French-Missourian variant, Prince Cochon Blanc ("Prince White Pig"), a prince is cursed by a fairy into a swine form by day and human shape by night. He returns to his father, explains the whole story, and his father builds him a stone enclosure. The pig wants to get married, so his father arranges for him marriage with a lady. The pig groom wants to kiss his bride, but she rebuffs him. Enraged, he devours her. This repeats with the second bride, but the third bride is kind and allows it. For her kindness, he shows her his true form at night, as a demonstration of trust. However, she betrays his trust at her mother's insistence, and she is forced to seek him out. One day, she arrives at a kingdom where her Prince White Pig is to be married to another princess, and bribes her with a silk handkerchief, a golden ball and a ring (given by helpful fairies) to spend a few nights with him.

Opera
An opera partly based on the tale, The Enchanted Pig, by the composer Jonathan Dove, was premiered in 2006.

See also
Animal as Bridegroom
Cupid and Psyche
Hans My Hedgehog
Long, Broad and Sharpsight
The Feather of Finist the Falcon
The Golden Crab
King Crin (Italian fairy tale)
The Seven Ravens
The Singing, Springing Lark
The Three Daughters of King O'Hara
Trusty John

Footnotes

References

External links 
Fairyland illustrated story: The Enchanted Pig

Fictional pigs
Romanian fairy tales
Romanian mythology
Fiction about magic
Pigs in literature
Fiction about shapeshifting
Witchcraft in fairy tales
ATU 400-459